Andrew John Higginbottom (born 22 October 1964) is an English former footballer who played in the Football League for Chesterfield, Cambridge United and Crystal Palace.

References

External links
 
 Profile at holmesdale.net

1964 births
Living people
Footballers from Chesterfield
English footballers
Association football defenders
Chesterfield F.C. players
Everton F.C. players
Maidstone United F.C. (1897) players
Cambridge United F.C. players
Crystal Palace F.C. players
English Football League players